Xylophanes clarki is a moth of the  family Sphingidae. It is known from Cuba, the Dominican Republic and Venezuela.

The length of the forewings is about 30 mm. It is similar to Xylophanes tersa tersa but distinguishable by the scalloped second to fourth postmedian lines on the forewing upperside. Furthermore, the first postmedian band is double and the inner element is either a discrete line running to the costa but angled sharply or a broader, more blurred band with a slight costal angle. The fifth postmedian line is relatively broad at the start but then becomes very weak and diffuse. The median band of the hindwing upperside consists of a series of small, yellow spots, somewhat suffused with orange.

The larvae probably feed on Rubiaceae or Malvaceae species.

References

clarki
Moths described in 1921